Country Acres is a census-designated place (CDP) in San Patricio County, Texas, United States. The population was 185 at the 2010 census. Prior to the 2010 census Country Acres was part of the Falman-County Acres CDP.

Geography
Country Acres is located at  (27.925064, -97.166012).

Education
It is in the Aransas Pass Independent School District.

References

Census-designated places in San Patricio County, Texas
Census-designated places in Texas
Corpus Christi metropolitan area